, also known as Sure Death 3, is a 1986 film directed by Eiichi Kudo, based on the television jidaigeki Hissatsu series Hissatsu Shigotonin V Gekitouhen. The film is an occasionally whimsical Japanese drama about assassins.

Plot
One day, Mondo Nakamura's colleague (Kiyohara) of Minamimachi Bugyo-sho is killed. Kiyohara was blackmailing Masuya. When Mondo visits Masuya, he senses Masauya is something to do with Kiyohara's death.

Cast
 Makoto Fujita as Mondo Nakamura
 Kunihiko Mitamura as Hide
 Hiroaki Murakami as Masa
 Masaki Kyomoto as Ryu
 Ayukawa Izumi as Kayo
 Toshio Shiba as Ichi
 Shōfukutei Tsurube II as San
 Toshio Yamauchi as Tanaka Sama
 Takuzo Kawatani as Kiyohara
 Kin Sugai as Sen Nakamura
 Mari Shiraki as Ritsu Nakamura
 Ittoku Kishibe as Hikomatsu
 Masatō Ibu 
 Junkichi Orimoto as Kanō Heima
 Tatsuo Endō as Rusui
 Mikio Narita as Masuya
 Keiko Matsuzaka as Oko

References

1986 films
1980s adventure films
1980s Japanese-language films
Jidaigeki films
Samurai films
Films directed by Eiichi Kudo
1980s Japanese films